Robert Carswell Lowther Sr. (December 14, 1923 – March 23, 2015) was an American professional basketball player. He played for the Tri-Cities Blackhawks and then the Waterloo Hawks in the National Basketball League during the 1948–49 season. Lowther averaged 1.9 points per game.

References

External links
 Obituary

1923 births
2015 deaths
All-American college men's basketball players
American men's basketball players
Basketball players from Louisiana
Centers (basketball)
Forwards (basketball)
LSU Tigers basketball players
LSU Tigers track and field athletes
Military personnel from Louisiana
Sportspeople from Alexandria, Louisiana
Tri-Cities Blackhawks players
United States Army Air Forces personnel of World War II
Waterloo Hawks players